The New Zealand cricket team toured England in June 2022 to play three Test matches, with the matches forming part of the 2021–2023 ICC World Test Championship. England also played three One Day International (ODI) matches against the Netherlands in Amstelveen between the second and third Tests.

In November 2021, the England and Wales Cricket Board (ECB) announced that Yorkshire County Cricket Club had been suspended from hosting international matches, following the racism experienced by Azeem Rafiq. Headingley was originally named as the venue for the third Test. In January 2022, the ECB set Yorkshire the deadline of spring 2022 to meet certain conditions to regain their international status for the match, with the suspension being lifted the following month.

In April 2022, following England's tour of the West Indies, Joe Root resigned as England's Test captain. Later the same month, the ECB named Ben Stokes as Root's successor. New Zealand named an extended squad of twenty players for the tour, with it being reduced to 15 for the opening Test match.

England won the first Test match by five wickets, with Joe Root scoring his 26th century and his 10,000th Test run in the process. It was England's first win in a Test after winning just one match in their previous 17 matches. In the second Test, New Zealand made 553 runs batting first, their highest innings score in England, with England making 539 in their first innings. England were set a target of 299 runs to win the match, with Jonny Bairstow hitting a 77-ball century, helping England to a five-wicket victory. England won the third Test match by seven wickets, chasing down their target of 113 runs in just 15.2 overs on the fifth and final day, to win the series 3–0. With the victory in the third match, England became the first team to chase a target of more than 250 runs to win in three successive Test matches.

Squads

On 30 May 2022, New Zealand named their squad for the first Test, with Jacob Duffy, Rachin Ravindra, Hamish Rutherford and Blair Tickner all being released from their initial squad of twenty players. Colin de Grandhomme suffered a foot injury during the first Test match, and was later ruled out of New Zealand's squad for the rest of the series. Ahead of the second Test, Kane Williamson was ruled out of the match after testing positive for COVID-19. As a result, Tom Latham was named New Zealand's captain for the match, with Hamish Rutherford being added to their squad. Kyle Jamieson suffered a back injury during the second Test, which ruled him out of New Zealand's squad for the third and final Test match. Blair Tickner was named as Jamieson's replacement. Cam Fletcher was also ruled out of New Zealand's squad for the third Test, due to a hamstring injury, with Dane Cleaver named as his replacement.

Ahead of the third Test, England added Jamie Overton to their squad. Prior to the start of the fourth day of the third Test, Sam Billings was added to England's squad as a COVID-19 substitute, after Ben Foakes returned a positive COVID-19 test the previous evening. Billings took the field at the start of day four, keeping wicket.

Tour matches

Test series

1st Test

2nd Test

3rd Test

Notes

References

External links
 Series home at ESPN Cricinfo

2022 in English cricket
2022 in New Zealand cricket
International cricket competitions in 2022
New Zealand cricket tours of England